Edward Dominik Jerzy Madejski (11 August 1914 – 15 February 1996) was a Polish football goalkeeper and chemistry engineer, who was a graduate of Mining-Metallurgic Academy in Kraków.

For most of his career, Madejski was a goalie of Wisła Kraków; in 11 games for the Poland national football team, letting 33 goals into his net. His debut in white-red Polish jersey took place on 6 September 1936 in Belgrade (Yugoslavia beat Poland 9-3). He was also part of Poland's squad at the 1936 Summer Olympics, but he did not play in any matches. The last game in which he represented Poland was held in Dublin, on 13 November 1938 (Ireland - Poland 3-2).

Madejski was famous for taking part in the 5 June 1938 Brazil vs. Poland match in Strasbourg, in which Poland lost 5-6 to Brazil (during this game Ernst Willimowski scored 4 goals for Poland). At that time Madejski was banned from playing in any Polish Soccer League teams (due to the scandal connected with his transfer from Wisła Kraków to Garbarnia Kraków), so for a year he was not associated with any club.

During the Second World War Madejski participated in various illegal soccer tournaments (all sports in Poland were banned by the German authorities). Arrested by the Gestapo, he spent a few months in the death row.

References

See also
 Polish Roster in World Cup Soccer France 1938

1914 births
1996 deaths
Polish footballers
Poland international footballers
Polonia Bytom players
Wisła Kraków players
1938 FIFA World Cup players
Footballers from Kraków
Polish Austro-Hungarians
People detained by the Polish Ministry of Public Security
Association football goalkeepers
Prisoners sentenced to death by Germany
Polish prisoners and detainees